The Battle of Ongal took place in the summer of 680 in the Ongal area, an unspecified location in and around the Danube delta near the Peuce Island, present-day Tulcea County, Romania. It was fought between the Bulgars, who had recently invaded the Balkans, and the Byzantine Empire, which ultimately lost the battle. The battle was crucial for the creation of the First Bulgarian Empire.

Origins of the conflict
In 632, Khan Kubrat united the Bulgars into the state of Old Great Bulgaria along the coasts of the Black Sea and Caspian Sea. After his death in the 660s his sons divided his kingdom amongst themselves. Batbayan, the eldest son, inherited the throne in Poltava but was defeated by and submitted to the rule of his ambitious relative Cozarig (Kotrag) who had undermined the state's unity by leading his Don-Volga Khazars (Kutrigs) in expansion campaigns extending his empire to the north where Volga Bulgaria would eventually remain. The third son Asparuh marched westward and settled in the Ongal area on the eastern banks of the Danube. Eventually the Avars fought back and after Asparuh consolidated his rule they launched an attack against the Byzantine lands to the south.

During that time the Byzantine Empire was at war with the Arabs who had recently besieged the capital Constantinople. However, in 680 the Byzantines defeated the Arabs and concluded a peace treaty. After this success the emperor Constantine IV was free to move against the Bulgars and led an army against Asparuh. In the meantime the Bulgar leader made an alliance with the Seven Slavic tribes for mutual protection against the Byzantines and formed a federation.

The battle

According to the Chronicles of Nikephoros I of Constantinople:

The Bulgars had built wooden ramparts in the swampy area near the Peuce Island. The marshes forced the Byzantines to attack from a weakened position and in smaller groups, which reduced the strength of their attack. With continuing attacks from the ramparts, the Bulgar defense eventually forced the Byzantines into a rout, followed up by the Bulgar cavalry. Many of the Byzantine soldiers perished. According to popular belief, the emperor had leg pain and went to Mesembria to seek treatment. The troops thought that he fled the battlefield and in turn began fleeing. When the Bulgars realised what was happening, they attacked and defeated their discouraged enemy.

Aftermath
After the victory, the Bulgars advanced south and seized the lands to the north of Stara Planina. In 681 they invaded Thrace defeating the Byzantines again. Constantine IV found himself in a dead-lock and asked for peace.

Significance
This battle was a significant moment in European history, as it led to the creation of a powerful state, which was to become a European medieval superpower in the 9th and 10th century along with the Byzantine and Frankish Empires. It became a cultural and spiritual centre of south Slavic Europe through most of the Middle Ages.

Honour
Ongal Peak in Tangra Mountains on Livingston Island in the South Shetland Islands, Antarctica is named for the historical Ongal area.

Footnotes

References
Атанас Пейчев и колектив, 1300 години на стража, Военно издателство, София 1984.
Йордан Андреев, Милчо Лалков, Българските ханове и царе, Велико Търново, 1996.
Пламен Павлов, Историята - далечна и близка, Велико Търново, 2010.

External links
 Byzantine Battles

680s conflicts
680
7th century in Bulgaria
Battles involving the First Bulgarian Empire
Battles of the Byzantine–Bulgarian Wars
680s in the Byzantine Empire
7th century in Romania
Military history of Romania
Budjak